Shaun Prater (born October 27, 1989) is a former American football cornerback. After playing college football for Iowa, he was drafted by the Cincinnati Bengals in the fifth round of the 2012 NFL Draft.

He has played for the Philadelphia Eagles, Minnesota Vikings, Indianapolis Colts, Denver Broncos, and Arizona Cardinals.

Early years
Prater attended Omaha Central High School in Omaha, Nebraska. He played mainly safety, but also saw time at wide receiver as a senior. He had 177 tackles, five interceptions, 20 passes defended, five sacks, six forced fumbles and two fumble recoveries. He also had 10 carries for 185 yards along with 12 receptions for 290 yards and four touchdowns.

In addition to football, he also ran track and field. He won the 400-meter dash at the 2007 Omaha South Invite with a time of 49.6 seconds. At the 2007 Nebraska State High School Championships, he finished second in the 400 meters, with a career-best time of 48.52 seconds, and third in the 200 meters, with another career-best time of 21.58 seconds.

College career

Iowa
Prater accepted a scholarship offer from Kirk Ferentz and attended the University of Iowa where he played cornerback for the Hawkeyes.  Prater was selected First-team All-Big Ten in 2010 and 2011.

Professional career

2012 NFL Combine

Cincinnati Bengals
Prater was selected by the Cincinnati Bengals in the fifth round (156th overall) of the 2012 NFL Draft. He was placed on injured reserve on August 24, 2012.

Philadelphia Eagles
On September 1, 2013, the Philadelphia Eagles claimed Prater off waivers. On October 21, the Philadelphia Eagles released Prater to make room for the signing of Emmanuel Acho.

Minnesota Vikings
On October 22, 2013, the Minnesota Vikings claimed Prater off waivers. The team released him on September 4, 2015. Then signed again with the Vikings on December 8, 2015.

Indianapolis Colts
The Indianapolis Colts signed Prater on September 29, 2015. He was released on October 2, 2015, but re-signed on October 4. Prater was waived on October 20.

Minnesota Vikings (second stint)
On December 8, 2015, Prater re-signed with the Minnesota Vikings. He was waived by the Vikings on December 14.

Denver Broncos
The Denver Broncos signed Prater on December 22, 2015. A week later he was waived by the team without playing a single game for them.

Arizona Cardinals 
On February 1, 2016, Prater signed a futures contract with the Arizona Cardinals. On August 29, 2016, Prater was waived by the Cardinals.

References

External links
 
 Minnesota Vikings bio 
 Philadelphia Eagles bio
 Cincinnati Bengals bio
 Iowa Hawkeyes bio 

1989 births
Living people
Players of American football from Nebraska
Sportspeople from Omaha, Nebraska
American football cornerbacks
Iowa Hawkeyes football players
Cincinnati Bengals players
Philadelphia Eagles players
Minnesota Vikings players
Indianapolis Colts players
Denver Broncos players
Arizona Cardinals players
Omaha Central High School alumni